Samuel J. Smith (July 23, 1922 – November 16, 1995) was a member of the Washington House of Representatives and the Seattle City Council. He was the first African-American to serve as a Seattle city councilman.

Early life
Smith was born on July 23, 1922, in Gibsland, Louisiana to a Baptist minister. Smith served stateside in the U.S. Army during World War II; in 1942 he was stationed in Seattle, Washington and, on discharge, decided to stay there. He went on to receive degrees from Seattle University (Social science, 1951) and the University of Washington (Economics, 1952) and went to work for the Boeing Company.

Political career
In 1958, Smith defeated Republican Charles Stokes for a seat in the Washington House of Representatives representing Washington's 37th legislative district. Smith's victory over Stokes, the third African-American elected to the Washington legislature, made him just the fourth African-American to win a seat in the state house, as well as the second from the Democratic Party. One of his first acts in the legislature was to introduce a bill that would have banned discrimination based on race or religion in the rental or sale of homes. The measure eventually passed in his final term.

Smith was reelected to three additional terms, serving in the legislature until January 1967 when he left to seek a seat on the Seattle City Council, which he won. Smith continued to serve on the council until 1991 when he was defeated for reelection due, in part, to mobilization of Seattle's LGBT community, who were upset with some of his socially conservative positions.

Smith served as president of the city council for eight years and ran unsuccessfully for Mayor of Seattle four times during his council tenure.

Personal life and death
Smith's wife, Marion King Smith, campaigned for Smith's former seat in the legislature in 1970, but was defeated by Republican Michael Ross. Smith would later attribute Ross' victory over his wife to a defection of Smith's traditional allies among the district's black leaders who were "afraid that the power in the black community was too centered on me. They knew I would be helping her [Marion] make decisions, and they didn't want me to have that kind of reach."

Smith suffered from ill health in his later years and lost a leg to diabetes in 1985. He died at his home in the Seward Park neighborhood of Seattle on November 16, 1995, at the age of 73. A park in Seattle is named after him.

See also
 William Owen Bush - first African-American elected to the Washington legislature

References

1922 births
1995 deaths
African-American state legislators in Washington (state)
Democratic Party members of the Washington House of Representatives
People from Gibsland, Louisiana
Seattle City Council members
Seattle University alumni
University of Washington College of Arts and Sciences alumni
20th-century American politicians
African-American city council members
20th-century African-American politicians
United States Army personnel of World War II